Undeniable is the seventh studio album by rapper, AZ, released on April 1, 2008 through Fast Life Music and Koch Records.

The album debuted at number 141 on the U.S. Billboard 200 chart, selling over 5,000 copies in its first week.

Track listing

Samples
Life on the Line
"Touch a Four Leaf Clover" by Atlantic Starr
Fire
"Space" by Galt MacDermot
"Let's Go Up" by Dennis Edwards
What Would You Do
"The Magic of Your Love" by The Majestic Arrows
Parking Lot Pimpin'
"Out There" by Willie Hutch
Go Getta
"Chocolate Girl" by The Whispers
Now I Know
"Da-Da" by Hiroshima

Chart positions

References

External links
“The Hardest” - Review Of AZ’s Undeniable

2008 albums
AZ (rapper) albums
Albums produced by Nottz
Albums produced by Large Professor
Albums produced by Emile Haynie
E1 Music albums